Qazian-e Olya (also Romanized as Qāẕīān-e ‘Olyā; also known as Deh-e Kohneh, Ghāzīān-e Bālā, Kazyān, Qal‘eh-ye Kohneh, Qāzeyān, Qāẕīān, Qāẕīān-e Bālā, and Qāzīyān) is a village in Shahidabad Rural District, Mashhad-e Morghab District, Khorrambid County, Fars Province, Iran. At the 2006 census, its population was 37, in 11 families.

References 

Populated places in Khorrambid County